Sorbier is a commune in the Allier department in central France.

Sorbier may also refer to:

Franck Sorbier, Paris fashion house that achieved haute couture status in 2005
Jean-Barthélemot Sorbier (1762–1827), French general of the Napoleonic Wars

See also 
 Sorbiers (disambiguation)